The Passyunk Avenue Bridge is a double leaf bascule bridge spanning the Schuylkill River between South Philadelphia and the Southwest Philadelphia sections of Philadelphia.

The current bridge was completed in 1983. It was constructed on an alignment slightly to the north of its predecessor, a 2-lane double-leaf bascule bridge dating to 1911.

See also
George C. Platt Bridge
List of crossings of the Schuylkill River
Passyunk Township, Pennsylvania
University Avenue Bridge, another bascule bridge in Philadelphia

References

Bascule bridges in the United States
Bridges over the Schuylkill River
Bridges in Philadelphia
Road bridges in Pennsylvania